Mian Tang or Mian-i-Tang or Meyan Tang may refer to:
 Mian Tang, Ilam
 Mian Tang, Kermanshah
 Miantang (disambiguation)